English Wars may refer to:
Anglo-Dutch Wars
English Wars (Scandinavia), between Denmark and Sweden, with British involvement
List of wars involving England

See also 
 List of wars involving Great Britain